Leptichnus is a genus of air-breathing land snails or semi-slugs, terrestrial pulmonate gastropod mollusks in the family Urocyclidae.

Leptichnus is the type genus of the tribe Leptichnini.

Species
Species within the genus Leptichnus include: 
 Leptichnus bernardi van Goethem

References

Urocyclidae
Taxonomy articles created by Polbot